Vice-Admiral Sir Henry Dudley (1517–1568) was an English Admiral, soldier, diplomat, and conspirator of the Tudor period.

Early life and family
Born in Dudley Castle, Staffordshire, Henry Dudley was the second son of John Sutton, 3rd Baron Dudley. His mother was Cicely, a daughter of Thomas Grey, 1st Marquis of Dorset. Dudley was the first cousin of Henry Grey, 1st Duke of Suffolk, the father of Lady Jane Grey, the second cousin once removed of John Dudley, 1st Duke of Northumberland, and the second cousin of Elizabeth I through their mutual great grandmother, Elizabeth Woodville. He is not to be confused with the youngest of Northumberland's sons, also named Henry Dudley, who married Margaret, the daughter of Lord Chancellor Thomas Audley.

Early career
Dudley became a monastic auditor under Thomas Cromwell in 1535, and then a soldier serving in Ireland under his uncle Leonard Grey in 1536, and in Scotland from 1540–3.  Dudley fought gallantly during the siege of Boulogne in 1544, and was made a Captain early in 1545 under Lord Clinton.

Promotion and imprisonment
He was promoted to Admiral of the Narrow Seas March 1552 when Lord Clinton was Lord Admiral, and knighted at Hampton Court on 11 October 1551. A close associate of his second cousin, the Duke of Northumberland, he was arrested on 25 July 1553 at Calais. The duke had sent him to France around 13 July 1553 to confer with King Henry II regarding French support in the event of an Imperial intervention in England. Dudley was imprisoned in the Tower of London, but pardoned by Queen Mary on 18 October 1553.

Visit to Paris
Henry Dudley, having once been Captain of the Guard at Boulogne had many friends in France and in December 1555 visited Paris, where he was curiously well received by King Henry II. Although Dudley returned home with only the vaguest of assurances, even Pope Paul was ill-disposed toward the English Queen Mary because of her marriage into the powerful Habsburg family and that same month signed a secret treaty with Henry II against Spanish dominion.

Conspiracy begins
Henry Dudley and his agents moved in January, to conceal stores of ammunition at strategic locations, and also secluded an amount of money totalling fifty thousand pounds, previously withdrawn and removed from the Exchequer, (where Dudley was a familiar visitor and had a number of friends), "in water by (London) bridge" to make ready for an invasion planned to be executed by mercenaries and exiles. The money was to be sent to France where his Protestant exile supporters would follow the initiative through.

In Spain, Charles V, Holy Roman Emperor abdicated on 16 January 1556, whereupon Philip and Mary became King and Queen of Spain, which at the time held the Netherlands. Philip had received a letter confirming that given the mood of the English Parliament even down to the people discontent was such that there was scant chance of him also being crowned in England at the same time or in the near future.

Organizes invasion force
Sir Henry Dudley had returned to France, and by March was engaged in the raising of an invasion force, with the intention of landing it on the Isle of Wight, to march on London. Had the plot not been discovered, its intention was to remove Mary to exile in Spain where she could be happily reunited with King Philip and to bring about the succession of Elizabeth to the English throne. Bold and righteous as it was, it proved too daring for most of the English gentry, who failed to lend it their support, "feebly, but not without some expectation, waiting for time to dispatch the evil Queen".

It was Henry Dudley who now took the initiative; while greater noblemen trembled, Dudley was abroad organising a widespread and sophisticated rebellion. Amongst his agents was the courtier and MP Henry Peckham, the son of Sir Edmund Peckham, then Master of the Tower Mint and a member of the Royal Council. Henry Peckham was detected in the plan to obtain funds by robbing the Exchequer and he soon found himself a prisoner of the Tower. In July 1556 he and his assistants were "hanged on the gallows of Tower Hill for treason against the queen .... and after cut down, beheaded and their bodies carried unto London Bridge and there set up and their bodies buried at Allhallows, Barking."

Plot dissolves
It appears that once revealed the plot dissolved and Henry Dudley remained at large in France, his great scheme undermined by careless talk and too unwieldy an organisation. He was consequently to become an exile in the French service between 1556 and 1563, but was again to return home and serve as "Capt. Dudley" in 1563, receiving an annuity later the same year from Queen Elizabeth for his service. In 1567 he obtained from Elizabeth some protection from his creditors that was extended to 1568. Sir Henry died between 1568 and 1570, but no will is known to exist.

References

Dictionary of National Biography, Dudley, Sir Henry (d 1565?), conspirator, by A. F. Pollard. Published 1901.

1517 births
1568 deaths
Recipients of English royal pardons
16th-century Royal Navy personnel
Henry
People from Dudley
English expatriates in France
Royal Navy vice admirals